David Arthur Watmough (August 17, 1926 – August 4, 2017) was a Canadian playwright, short story writer and novelist.

Watmough was born in London, England, and attended King's College London. He has worked as a reporter (the Cornish Guardian, a 'Talks Producer' (BBC Third Programme) and an editor (Ace Books). He immigrated to Canada in 1960, to Kitsilano in Vancouver, British Columbia, where he lived for 40 years with his partner, ex-Californian Floyd St. Clair (1930–2009), an opera critic and, from 1963 till his retirement in 1996, a University of British Columbia French professor. He became a Canadian citizen in 1967.

Watmough lived from 2004 to 2009 in Boundary Bay and before his death had been living at Crofton Manor, a Vancouver assisted-living facility.

In 2008 he published his autobiography, "Myself Through Others: Memoirs".

Selected bibliography 
 1951: A Church Renascent: A Study in Modern French Catholicism, London: S.P.C.K.
 1967: Names for the Numbered Years: Three Plays, Vancouver: Bau-Xi Gallery
 1972: Ashes for Easter and Other Monodramas, Talonbooks
 1975: From a Cornish Landscape, Padstow, Cornwall: Lodenk Press
 1975: Love & The Waiting Game, Oberon
 1978: No More Into the Garden, Doubleday
 1982: Collected Shorter Fiction of David Watmough: 1972–82
 1982: Unruly Skeletons
 1984: The Connecticut Countess, Crossing Press
 1984: Fury, Oberon
 1986: Vibrations in Time, Mosaic
 1988: The Year of Fears, Mosaic
 1992: Thy Mother's Glass, Harper Collins, 
 1994: The Time of the Kingfishers, Arsenal Pulp Press, 
 1996: Hunting With Diana, Arsenal Pulp Press, 
 2002: The Moor is Dark Beneath the Moon, Dundurn,     
 2005: Vancouver Voices, Ripple Effect Press, 
 2007: Geraldine, Ekstasis, 
 2008: Coming Down the Pike: Sonnets, Ekstasis,  
 2008: Myself Through Others: Memoirs, Dundurn, 
 2010: Eyes and Ears on Boundary Bay, Ekstasis, 
 2011: To Each an Albatross, Ekstasis, 
 2013: Songs from the Hive, Ekstasis,

References

External links
 David Arthur Watmough  at The Canadian Encyclopedia

1926 births
2017 deaths
20th-century Canadian dramatists and playwrights
21st-century Canadian dramatists and playwrights
20th-century Canadian novelists
21st-century Canadian novelists
Canadian male novelists
Canadian male short story writers
English emigrants to Canada
Canadian gay writers
Writers from London
Writers from Vancouver
Alumni of King's College London
Canadian LGBT dramatists and playwrights
Canadian LGBT novelists
Canadian autobiographers
Canadian male dramatists and playwrights
20th-century Canadian short story writers
21st-century Canadian short story writers
20th-century Canadian male writers
21st-century Canadian male writers
Canadian male non-fiction writers
21st-century Canadian LGBT people
Gay dramatists and playwrights
Gay novelists